Samunpur is a village of Mandi Bahauddin District in the Punjab province of Pakistan. It is located at 32°41'0N 73°33'0E at an altitude of 213 metres (702 feet).

References

Villages in Mandi Bahauddin District